The Caning of Charles Sumner, or the Brooks–Sumner Affair, occurred on May 22, 1856, in the United States Senate chamber, when Representative Preston Brooks, a pro-slavery Democrat from South Carolina, used a walking cane to attack Senator Charles Sumner, an abolitionist Republican from Massachusetts. The attack was in retaliation for a speech given by Sumner two days earlier in which he fiercely criticized slaveholders, including pro-slavery South Carolina Senator Andrew Butler, a relative of Brooks. The beating nearly killed Sumner and contributed significantly to the country's polarization over the issue of slavery. It has been considered symbolic of the "breakdown of reasoned discourse" and the use of violence that eventually led to the Civil War.

Although Sumner was unable to return to the Senate until December 1859, the Massachusetts legislature refused to replace him, leaving his empty desk in the Senate as a public reminder of the attack.

Background

In 1856, during the "Bleeding Kansas" crisis, Sumner denounced the Kansas–Nebraska Act in his "Crime against Kansas" speech, delivered on May 19 and May 20. The long speech argued for the immediate admission of Kansas as a free state and went on to denounce the "Slave Power"—the political arm of the slave owners:

Sumner then attacked the authors of the Act, Senators Stephen A. Douglas of Illinois and Andrew Butler of South Carolina. Regarding Butler in particular, Sumner said:

Sumner was alluding that Butler was Don Quixote and slavery was his Dulcinea. Some commentators think that Sumner mocked Butler's speaking ability, which had been impeded by a recent stroke, when he decried Butler's "blunders":

According to Manisha Sinha, Sumner had been ridiculed and insulted by both Douglas and Butler for his opposition to the Fugitive Slave Law and the Kansas-Nebraska Act, with Butler crudely race-baiting Sumner by making sexual allusions to black women, like many slaveholders who accused abolitionists of promoting interracial marriage.

Sexually charged accusations were also part of the abolitionist lexicon. Williamjames Hoffer states that "It is also important to note the sexual imagery that recurred throughout [Sumner's] oration, which was neither accidental nor without precedent. Abolitionists routinely accused slaveholders of maintaining slavery so that they could engage in forcible sexual relations with their slaves." Douglas said during the speech that "this damn fool is going to get himself killed by some other damn fool".

Representative Preston Brooks, Butler's first cousin once removed, was infuriated. He later said that he intended to challenge Sumner to a duel, and consulted with fellow South Carolina Representative Laurence M. Keitt on dueling etiquette. Keitt told him that dueling was for gentlemen of equal social standing, and that Sumner was no better than a drunkard, due to the supposedly coarse language he had used during his speech. Brooks said that he concluded that since Sumner was no gentleman, he did not merit honorable treatment; to Keitt and Brooks, it was more appropriate to humiliate Sumner by beating him with a cane in a public setting.

Day of the attack

Two days later, on the afternoon of May 22, 1856, Brooks entered the Senate chamber with Keitt and another ally, Representative Henry A. Edmundson of Virginia.  They waited for the galleries to clear, being particularly concerned that there be no ladies present to witness what Brooks intended to do.  He confronted Sumner as he sat writing at his desk in the almost empty Senate chamber. "Mr. Sumner, I have read your speech twice over carefully. It is a libel on South Carolina, and Mr. Butler, who is a relative of mine", Brooks calmly announced in a low voice.  As Sumner began to stand up, Brooks beat Sumner severely on the head before he could reach his feet, using a thick gutta-percha cane with a gold head. The force of the blows so shocked Sumner that he lost his sight immediately. "I no longer saw my assailant, nor any other person or object in the room. What I did afterwards was done almost unconsciously, acting under the instincts of self-defense", he recalled later.

Sumner was knocked down and trapped under the heavy desk that was bolted to the floor.  His chair, which was pulled up to his desk, moved back and forth on a track; Sumner either could not or did not think to slide his chair back to escape, so it pinned him under his desk.  Brooks continued to strike Sumner until Sumner rose to his feet and ripped the desk from the floor in an effort to get away from Brooks.  By this time, Sumner was blinded by his own blood. He staggered up the aisle and, arms outstretched, vainly attempted to defend himself, but that made him an even larger and easier target for Brooks, who continued to beat him across the head, face, and shoulders "to the full extent of [my] power". Brooks did not stop when his cane snapped; he continued thrashing Sumner with the piece that held the gold head. Sumner stumbled and reeled convulsively, "Oh Lord," he gasped, "Oh! Oh!" Near the end of the attack, Sumner collapsed unconscious, although shortly before he succumbed, he "bellowed like a calf" according to Brooks. Brooks grabbed the falling Sumner, held him up by the lapel with one hand, and continued to lash out at him with the cane in the other.  Several other Senators and Representatives attempted to help Sumner, but were blocked by Edmundson, who yelled at the spectators to leave Brooks and Sumner alone, and Keitt, who brandished his own cane and a pistol, and shouted, "Let them be!" and "Let them alone, God damn you, let them alone!"

Senator John J. Crittenden attempted to intervene, and pleaded with Brooks not to kill Sumner.  Senator Robert Toombs then interceded for Crittenden, telling Keitt not to attack someone who was not a party to the dispute, though Toombs also indicated later that he had no issue with Brooks beating Sumner, and in fact approved of it.

Representatives Ambrose S. Murray and Edwin B. Morgan were finally able to intervene and restrain Brooks, at which point he quietly left the chamber.  Murray obtained the aid of a Senate page and the Sergeant at Arms, Dunning R. McNair.  As Sumner regained consciousness they were able to assist him to walk to a cloakroom.  Sumner received first aid and medical attention, including several stitches.  With the aid of Nathaniel P. Banks, the Speaker of the House, and Senator Henry Wilson, Sumner was able to travel by carriage to his lodgings, where he received further medical treatment.  Brooks also required medical attention before leaving the Capitol; he had hit himself above his right eye with one of his backswings.

The cane Brooks used was broken into several pieces, which he left on the blood-soaked floor of the Senate chamber.  Some, including the cane's gold head, were recovered by Edmundson, who gave the portion with the head to Adam John Glossbrenner, the House Sergeant at Arms.  This portion of the cane eventually ended up at the Old State House Museum in Boston; it was worked to smooth the edges and finish, and then put on display.  Southern lawmakers made rings out of the other pieces Edmundson recovered from the Senate floor, which they wore on neck chains to show their solidarity with Brooks, who boasted "[The pieces of my cane] are begged for as sacred relics."

Aftermath

The episode revealed the polarization in America, which had now reached the floor of the Senate. Sumner became a martyr in the North and Brooks a hero in the South. Northerners were outraged. The Cincinnati Gazette said, "The South cannot tolerate free speech anywhere, and would stifle it in Washington with the bludgeon and the bowie-knife, as they are now trying to stifle it in Kansas by massacre, rapine, and murder." William Cullen Bryant of the New York Evening Post, asked, "Has it come to this, that we must speak with bated breath in the presence of our Southern masters? ... Are we to be chastised as they chastise their slaves? Are we too, slaves, slaves for life, a target for their brutal blows, when we do not comport ourselves to please them?" Thousands attended rallies in support of Sumner in Boston, Albany, Cleveland, Detroit, New Haven, New York, and Providence. More than a million copies of Sumner's speech were distributed. Two weeks after the caning, Ralph Waldo Emerson described the divide the incident represented: "I do not see how a barbarous community and a civilized community can constitute one state. I think we must get rid of slavery, or we must get rid of freedom."

Conversely, Brooks was praised by Southern newspapers. The Richmond Enquirer editorialized that Sumner should be caned "every morning", praising the attack as "good in conception, better in execution, and best of all in consequences" and denounced "these vulgar abolitionists in the Senate" who "have been suffered to run too long without collars. They must be lashed into submission." Southerners sent Brooks hundreds of new canes in endorsement of his assault. One was inscribed "Hit him again."

Massachusetts Representative Anson Burlingame publicly humiliated Brooks by goading him into challenging Burlingame to a duel, only to set conditions designed to intimidate Brooks into backing down. (As the challenged party, Burlingame, who was a crack shot, had the choice of weapons and dueling ground. He selected rifles on the Canada side of Niagara Falls, where U.S. anti-dueling laws would not apply. Brooks withdrew his challenge, claiming that he did not want to expose himself to the risk of violence by traveling through Northern states to get to Niagara Falls.)

Senator Henry Wilson, Sumner's colleague from Massachusetts, called the beating by Brooks "brutal, murderous, and cowardly", and in response Brooks challenged Wilson to a duel. Wilson declined, saying that he could not legally or by personal conviction participate, and calling dueling "the lingering relic of a barbarous civilization". In reference to a rumor that Brooks might attack him in the Senate, Wilson told the press "I have sought no controversy, and I seek none, but I shall go where duty requires, uninfluenced by threats of any kind." Wilson continued to perform his Senate duties, and Brooks did not make good on his threat.

Historian William Gienapp has concluded that Brooks' "assault was of critical importance in transforming the struggling Republican party into a major political force".

Southerners mocked Sumner, claiming he was faking his injuries. They argued that the cane Brooks used was not heavy enough to inflict severe injuries. They also claimed that Brooks had not hit Sumner more than a few times, and had not hit him hard enough to cause serious health concerns. In fact, Sumner suffered head trauma that caused him chronic, debilitating pain for the rest of his life and symptoms consistent with what is now called traumatic brain injury and post-traumatic stress disorder; he spent three years convalescing before returning to his Senate seat. Massachusetts pointedly did not replace him, and left his empty desk in the Senate as a visible reminder of the incident. The state legislature reelected him in 1857, even though he was unable to take his seat until 1859.

Brooks claimed that he had not intended to kill Sumner, or else he would have used a different weapon. In a speech to the House defending his actions, Brooks stated that he "meant no disrespect to the Senate of the United States" or the House by his attack on Sumner. Brooks was arrested for the assault. He was tried in a District of Columbia court, convicted, and fined $300 (equivalent to $ in ), but received no prison sentence. A motion for Brooks' expulsion from the House failed, but he resigned on July 15 in order to permit his constituents to ratify or condemn his conduct via a special election. They approved; Brooks was quickly returned to office after the August 1 vote, and then re-elected to a new term of office later in 1856, but he died of croup before the new term began.

Keitt was censured by the House. He resigned in protest, but his constituents ratified his conduct by overwhelmingly reelecting him to his seat within a month. In 1858, he attempted to choke Representative Galusha Grow of Pennsylvania (Republican) for calling him a "negro driver" during an argument on the House floor.

An effort to censure Edmundson failed to obtain a majority of votes in the House.

In the 1856 elections, the new Republican Party made gains by use of the twin messages of "Bleeding Kansas" and "Bleeding Sumner", because both events served to paint pro-slavery Democrats as extremists. Though the Democrats won the presidential election and increased their majority in the House because the Three-fifths Compromise gave Democrats an advantage, Republicans made major gains in elections for the state legislatures, which enabled them to make gains in the U.S. Senate elections, because senators were chosen by the state legislatures. The violence in Kansas and the beating of Sumner helped the Republicans coalesce and cohere as a party, which set the stage for their victory in the 1860 presidential election.

During the 1856 lame duck session of Congress, Brooks made a speech calling for the admission of Kansas "even with a constitution rejecting slavery". His conciliatory tone impressed Northerners and disappointed slavery's supporters.

See also
 List of incidents of political violence in Washington, D.C.

References

Bibliography

External links
 The Caning of Senator Charles Sumner (U.S. Senate website)
C-SPAN Q&A interview with Stephen Puleo about his book The Caning: The Assault that Drove America to Civil War, June 21, 2015

Abolitionism in the United States
History of the United States Congress
Bleeding Kansas
1856 in Washington, D.C.
1856 in American politics
1856 crimes in the United States
Violence in Washington, D.C.
Crimes in Washington, D.C.
Political violence in the United States
34th United States Congress
May 1856 events
Origins of the American Civil War
1850s crimes in the United States
Racially motivated violence in the United States
Caning of Charles Sumner